Mark Bridges is an American costume designer. He has frequently collaborated with Paul Thomas Anderson for each of his films. Bridges has been nominated four times for the Academy Award for Best Costume Design, winning two for The Artist (2011) and Phantom Thread (2017). For the latter, he won a Jet Ski and a stay in Lake Havasu City, Arizona resort, as a part of the Academy Awards telecast stunt to award the Oscar recipient who gave the shortest acceptance speech. His other awards include two BAFTA Awards for Best Costume Design for his designs for The Artist and Phantom Thread.

Personal life 
Bridges was born in Niagara Falls, New York. He was a student for the theater club at La Salle High School. Bridges studied theater at Niagara County Community College and received a Bachelor of Arts in Theater Arts from Stony Brook University in 1983. After graduating, he moved to New York City to start working as a fabric shopper on Broadway for Barbara Matera Ltd. For the next few years, he worked on various theatrical productions, including Oh! Calcutta! and Dreamgirls, while attending graduate school at New York University. He graduated with a Master of Fine Arts degree in Costume Design from the Tisch School of the Arts of New York University in 1987.

Career 
Bridges moved to Los Angeles and was asked to work as a costume assistant for Richard Hornung. Bridges won two Academy Awards for Best Costume Designer for The Artist and Phantom Thread. At the 90th Academy Awards, Jimmy Kimmel offered as a prize for the shortest acceptance speech a Jet Ski and trip to Lake Havasu. Kimmel announced Bridges as the winner since his speech was the shortest at 35 seconds. Helen Mirren and Bridges were shown on the jet ski at the end of the ceremony.

Filmography

Television credits

Awards and nominations

References

External links

 
 
 

Living people
American costume designers
Best Costume Design Academy Award winners
Best Costume Design BAFTA Award winners
People from Niagara Falls, New York
Stony Brook University alumni
Tisch School of the Arts alumni
Year of birth missing (living people)
Place of birth missing (living people)